Ungulinidae is a family of marine bivalve molluscs in the order Venerida.

Characteristics
The members of this family are found in muddy sand or gravel at or below low tide mark. They have characteristically rounded shells with forward-facing umbones (projections). The valves are flattened and deeply etched with concentric rings. Each valve bears two cardinal and two plate-like lateral teeth. These molluscs do not have siphons but the extremely long foot makes a channel which is then lined with slime and serves for the intake and expulsion of water.

Genera
The following genera are recognised in the family Ungulinidae:
 
†Bruetia 
Diplodonta 
Felaniella 
Foveamysia 
Joannisiella 
Lamysia 
Microstagon 
Neodiplodonta 
Phlyctiderma 
Timothynus 
Transkeia 
Ungulina 
Zemysia 
Zemysina

References

 DiscoverLife
 Powell A. W. B., New Zealand Mollusca, William Collins Publishers Ltd, Auckland, New Zealand 1979 

 
Bivalve families